Aria Nasimi Shad (born 7 November 1999 in Mashhad) is an Iranian Swimmer. Nasimi-Shad competed in 2016 Summer Olympics – Men's 200 metre breaststroke.

References 

Living people
Iranian male swimmers
Olympic swimmers of Iran
Swimmers at the 2016 Summer Olympics
1999 births
People from Mashhad
Swimmers at the 2014 Asian Games
Asian Games competitors for Iran
Islamic Solidarity Games competitors for Iran
Islamic Solidarity Games medalists in swimming
21st-century Iranian people